Coccinella trifasciata, the three-banded lady beetle, is a species of lady beetle in the family Coccinellidae. It has a broad distribution, including North America, Europe, Northern Asia (excluding China), Oceania, and Southern Asia.

Subspecies
These three subspecies belong to the species Coccinella trifasciata:
 Coccinella trifasciata perplexa Mulsant, 1850
 Coccinella trifasciata subversa LeConte, 1854
 Coccinella trifasciata trifasciata Linnaeus, 1758

References

Further reading

External links

 

Coccinellidae
Articles created by Qbugbot
Beetles described in 1792